Ohad Levita (born 17 February 1986) is an Israeli footballer who plays for Hapoel Haifa .

Club career

Levita played for local side Hapoel Kfar Saba, making his first team debut at the age of seventeen in the Israeli Premier League match against F.C. Ashdod. He gave up five goals in a 5–2 drubbing.

On 25 August 2009, Levita signed on a free transfer with Dutch club RKC Waalwijk.

On 5 October 2011, Levita signed on a free transfer with Israeli club Hapoel Be'er Sheva.

On 11 June 2012, Levita signed a contract with AC Omonia.

On 28 June 2013, Levita returned to Israel as he signed a 3 years contract with Maccabi Netanya. In his first season with the club he helped them win the Liga Leumit as well as reaching the finals of the State Cup. The following season he was loaned to Maccabi Haifa for one season, there he mainly sat on the bench as a second option.

International career
Ohad made 17 caps and was also the captain of the Israeli U-21 national team.

His first call up for the senior national team came in May 2010 but he has yet to make a cap.

Honours

Club
Hapoel Kfar Saba
Israel Second Division (2): 2004–05, 2013–14

RKC Waalwijk
Eerste Divisie (1): 2010–11

AC Omonia
Cyprus FA Shield (1): 2012

Maccabi Haifa
Israel State Cup (1): 2016

References

External links
UEFA U-21 Site 

1986 births
Living people
Israeli Jews
Israeli footballers
Israel under-21 international footballers
Association football goalkeepers
Hapoel Kfar Saba F.C. players
RKC Waalwijk players
Hapoel Be'er Sheva F.C. players
AC Omonia players
Maccabi Netanya F.C. players
Maccabi Haifa F.C. players
Hapoel Haifa F.C. players
Israeli expatriate footballers
Israeli Premier League players
Liga Leumit players
Eredivisie players
Cypriot First Division players
Expatriate footballers in the Netherlands
Expatriate footballers in Cyprus
Israeli expatriate sportspeople in the Netherlands
Israeli expatriate sportspeople in Cyprus
Footballers from Kfar Saba